TNM may refer to:

 TNM staging system, a cancer staging system
 Teniente R. Marsh Airport, the main airport in Antarctica
 Telekom Networks Malawi, a Malawian mobile telecommunications company
 Tetranitromethane, an organic oxidizer
 The Nameless Mod, a total conversion mod released in 2009 for the game Deus Ex
 Thomas Nelson (publisher) (NYSE stock symbol), a publishing firm that began in Scotland in 1798
 Tokyo National Museum, the oldest and largest museum in Japan
 The News Minute, an Indian online publication
 Texas Nationalist Movement, a Texan political organization